Ring Up the Curtain is a 1919 American short comedy film featuring Harold Lloyd. The film survives and is available on DVD.

Plot
A troupe of performers arrives for a performance at a local opera house.  Shortly before their arrival, the opera house's short-tempered manager fires the majority of the stage hands for drunkenness, leaving only Harold.  Harold agrees to try to run the activities behind the stage by himself.  Trouble starts when Harold accidentally sets a snake charmer's animal free.  Harold is smitten by the attractive Leading Lady who openly flirts with him.  A jealous Harold enters the stage and ruins a dramatic scene where the villainous Leading Man tries to kiss the Leading Lady.  This starts a wild brawl onstage.  The show ends abruptly and the Leading Lady sadly informs Harold that she is now destitute.  Harold gives her some money.  Seconds later she leaves arm-in-arm with the actor who had played the villain.  Harold realizes he has been conned:  "There's a sucker born every minute--and I must have been twins!"  The film ends with Harold turning on the gas in a dressing room, seemingly to commit suicide.

Cast
 Harold Lloyd as The Stage Hand
 Bebe Daniels as The Leading Lady
 Snub Pollard as The Leading Man
 Bud Jamison as An Actor
 Noah Young as An Actor
 Edith Depew
 Florence Depew
 Billy Fay
 William Gillespie
 Oscar Larson
 James Parrott
 William Petterson
 Emmy Wallace (as Emmylou Wallace)
 Dorothea Wolbert
 Sammy Brooks as Troup Manager (uncredited)
 Helen Gilmore as Manager's Wife (uncredited)
 Estelle Harrison as Actress (uncredited)
 Wallace Howe as Conductor (uncredited)
 Dee Lampton as Actor (uncredited)
 Marie Mosquini as Actress (uncredited)
 Fred C. Newmeyer as Stagehand (uncredited)
 Charles Stevenson as Stagehand (uncredited)

See also
 Harold Lloyd filmography

References

External links

1919 films
American silent short films
1919 comedy films
1919 short films
American black-and-white films
Films directed by Alfred J. Goulding
Silent American comedy films
American comedy short films
Surviving American silent films
1910s American films